The Walthamstow Club was an English association and rugby club based at Palmerston Road in Walthamstow.

History

The club gave its foundation date as September 1867, under the secretaryship of Frederick Walker, and captaincy of Philip Rouquette.  There is reference to a different Walthamstow club losing to the Forest club in 1865, and Rouquette and several of the club's players (including Rouquette, his brother Henry, H. Lloyd, A. Borwick, and E. Parry) had played for the Walthamstow Rifles club before the Walthamstow club foundation.

In 1868 the club had 40 members paying a subscription of 2s 6d per annum. 

The club's first association match against another club was a 1-0 away win against the Tottenham & Edmonton club on 2 November 1867 and last recorded association match a 2-1 defeat to the Forest School in February 1874, although for its last two seasons the only association opponent the club had was the Forest School.

The club continued to play rugby into the 1880s, including fixtures against London Scottish and Oxford and Cambridge Universities in 1881.

Colours

The club's original colours were red, blue and white.  In 1882 they changed to yellow and black.

Notable players

Philip Rouquette and A. Borwick, who were also members of the Wanderers

References

Association football clubs established in 1867
Defunct football clubs in England
Defunct football clubs in London
1867 establishments in England
Association football clubs established in the 19th century